Coenopoeus niger is a species of longhorn beetles of the subfamily Lamiinae. It was described by George Henry Horn in 1894, and is known from Baja California.

References

Beetles described in 1894
Acanthocinini